Rhacheosaurus is an extinct genus of marine crocodyliform belonging to the family  Metriorhynchidae. The genus was established by Christian Erich Hermann von Meyer in 1831 for skeletal remains from the Tithonian (Late Jurassic) of Germany.

History and classification

 
A phylogenetic analysis in 2009 showed that several long-snouted species formerly classified in the related genera Geosaurus, Enaliosuchus, and Metriorhynchus were in fact more closely related to the original specimens of Cricosaurus, and thus were re-classified into this genus. This analysis also resurrected the generic name Rhacheosaurus.

Niche partitioning 
Several species of metriorhynchids are known from the Mörnsheim Formation (Solnhofen limestone, early Tithonian) of Bavaria, Germany: Rhacheosaurus gracilis, Dakosaurus maximus, Geosaurus giganteus and Cricosaurus suevicus. It has been hypothesised that niche partitioning enabled several species of crocodyliforms to co-exist. The long-snouted C. suevicus and R. gracilis would have fed mostly on fish, although the more lightly built Rhacheosaurus may have specialised towards feeding on small prey. In addition to these four species of metriorhynchids, a moderate-sized species of Steneosaurus was also contemporaneous.

References

Late Jurassic crocodylomorphs of Europe
Prehistoric pseudosuchian genera
Prehistoric marine crocodylomorphs
Solnhofen fauna
Thalattosuchians
Fossil taxa described in 1831